TPB AFK: The Pirate Bay Away From Keyboard is a 2013 Swedish documentary film directed and produced by Simon Klose. It focuses on the lives of the three founders of The Pirate Bay – Peter Sunde, Fredrik Neij, and Gottfrid Svartholm – and the Pirate Bay trial. Filming began sometime in 2008, and concluded on 28 February 2012.

Production
The film's website was launched on 28 August 2010, along with a Kickstarter campaign to raise US$25,000 to hire an editor after the Court of Appeal trial. The campaign was fully funded within three days and raised $51,424 in total. In February 2011, the Swedish Arts Grants Committee granted the project an additional 200,000 SEK (≈$30,000).

Release

The full film was released under the Creative Commons BY-NC-ND license onto The Pirate Bay, YouTube, and other BitTorrent sites. Additionally, a four-minute shorter version with certain copyright restricted content removed was released at the same time under the Creative Commons BY-NC-SA license to allow remixing.

TPB AFK premiered at the 63rd Berlin International Film Festival on 8 February 2013 – opening the festival's 'Panorama Dokumente' section – coinciding with its free online release on YouTube and The Pirate Bay.

On 19 February 2013, the film was broadcast on BBC Four in the UK as part of the BBC's Storyville documentary series.

Reception
Peter Sunde, one of the subjects of the documentary, wrote that he has "mixed feelings about the movie and the release of it". Whilst he likes the technical side of the documentary, he has issues with some scenes and general attitude of the documentary; this includes too much focus put on the trial, too dark depiction of it, and portraying himself beyond self-recognition. Despite having such different views on the subject, he regards the director as a friend.

Censorship by Hollywood
In May 2013, Hollywood studios – such as Viacom, Paramount, Fox and Lionsgate – started to censor Google Search links pointing to the documentary, an action criticized by Simon Klose. In June, after the initial controversy, HBO and Lionsgate sent additional bogus DMCA takedown notices to Google requesting the removal of links related to TPB AFK. In response, Simon Klose contacted Chilling Effects, who recommended him to file a DMCA counter-notice once he had found out whether Google had taken down the links or not. Two months later, the censored links were reinstated only after public complaints made by Klose.

See also
 Good Copy Bad Copy
 Piracy is theft
 May 2006 police raid of The Pirate Bay
 RiP!: A Remix Manifesto
 Steal This Film

References

External links

Main sites
 TPB AFK: The Pirate Bay Away From Keyboard on Kickstarter
 
 
  – as part of BBC's Storyville TV documentary strand

Documentary online
 TPB AFK: The Pirate Bay Away From Keyboard on The Pirate Bay
 TPB AFK: The Pirate Bay Away From Keyboard on YouTube

The Pirate Bay
File sharing
Internet documentary films
Creative Commons-licensed documentary films
Open content films
Kickstarter-funded documentaries
Swedish documentary films
2013 films
2013 documentary films
Documentary films about the Internet
Documentary films about politics
Films set in Sweden
Films set in Cambodia
Films set in Laos
Works about intellectual property law
Works about computer hacking
2010s Swedish films